Tucher is a brewery and beer brand based in Fürth and Nuremberg, Germany. It was founded in Nuremberg in 1672 . It is owned by the Radeberger Group, a division of the Oetker Group.

History 
The name comes from Freiherrlich von Tucher'sche Brauerei, which was a royal brewery of the House of Tucher von Simmelsdorf.

Operations
As of September 2012, Tucher Bräu exported its products to approximately 21 countries.

As of February 2014, Kerstin Bellair was the only brewmaster at Tucher Bräu. Brewery production is monitored in a control center, and the brewery also has a high-tech laboratory for quality control and assurance testing.

Products
Tucher Bräu produces lagers, several wheat beers, seasonal beers, such as a Christmas beer, and specialty beers.

Awards
Tucher Bräu has received 11 gold medals from the German Agricultural Society.

See also
 List of brewing companies in Germany
 List of oldest companies

References

Further reading

External links

  
 Tucher Bräu extends contract for green beer at Greuther Fürth stadium. March 18, 2012.
 

Beer and breweries in Bavaria
Breweries in Germany
Dr. Oetker